Tianhe Smart City station, is a station of Line 21 on the Guangzhou Metro.  It started operations on 20 December 2019.

Station layout

Exits
There are 4 exits, lettered A, B, C and D. Exit A is accessible. All exits are located on Gaotang Road.

References

Railway stations in China opened in 2019
Guangzhou Metro stations in Tianhe District